Strepsils is a brand of throat lozenges manufactured by Reckitt. Strepsils throat lozenges are used to relieve discomfort caused by mouth and throat infections.

Ingredients
The primary active ingredients are dichlorobenzyl alcohol and amylmetacresol, with some formulations containing ascorbic acid (vitamin C). Inactive ingredients include menthol, tartaric acid, and propylene glycol.

History
Strepsils was originally introduced in 1950 by Boots Healthcare as a mouthwash. Strepsils throat lozenges were introduced in 1958. Strepsils was one of the Boots Healthcare brands acquired by Reckitt Benckiser in 2006.

Strepsils have been in production since 1958 and contain two active ingredients, namely: amylmetacresol and 2,4-dichlorobenzyl alcohol. These ingredients are mild antiseptics that can kill bacteria associated with mouth and throat infections. However, as indicated in the package, research has not demonstrated the presence of an antibacterial agent to reduce the duration or severity of an infection. Extra Strepsils contains hexylresorcinol as an active ingredient and strepsils sore throat and nose covered contains menthol 8 mg. Reckitt Benckiser also produces a higher resistance pill that used to be marketed under the Strepsils Intensive label, but is now marketed under the Strefen brand, which contains the active ingredient flurbiprofen 8.75 mg.

In Australia and Argentina also Reckitt Benckiser market Strepsils Plus, which contains lidocaine, as well as antiseptic agents present in original Strepsils. In Strepsils Spain they are also available with lidocaine marketed as Strepsils Lidocaine instead.

The name of Strepsil comes from the streptococcus bacteria that causes certain types of sore throat.

 Strepsils are sold in Italy under the Benagol brand.
 In Germany are sold now as Dobendan and Dobensana brand, from 2009 till 2013 were sold as Dobendan Strepsils.
 In Strepsils Norway they are sold without active ingredients under the Repsil brand.

Dose 
The recommended dose is a tablet every 2–3 hours for adults.

Vitamin C is added for Strepsils vitamin C-100. Each Strepsils Vitamin C-100 pill contains 1.2 mg of 2,4-dichlorobenzyl alcohol, Amylmetacresol 0.6 mg and 100 mg of vitamin C.

References

External links
   Report on Strepsils lozenges by the Medicines and Healthcare products Regulatory Agency (MHRA)

Throat lozenges
Reckitt brands